"Earthy Anecdote" is the first poem in Wallace Stevens' first book of poetry Harmonium (1923). The passage of a group of "bucks" is impeded by a "firecat".

Interpretation
According to Martha Strom's interpretation of this poem, "Stevens locates the bucks in Oklahoma, which firmly situates the poem in the 'local' school of writing, but he imbues the localist donnée—a particular landscape, some bucks, and a cat in Oklahoma—with the motion of his imagination, and the flat 'local' scene acquires texture and life". When Stevens was a student at Harvard he was interested in the local-color-movement in American writing, but that interest grew into a lifelong philosophical study of imagination and reality and how their intersection could lead to poetry. Those terms are ones that apply more usefully to "Earthy Anecdote" than "local color".

References

 Strom, Martha. "Wallace Stevens' Revisions of Crispin's Journal: A Reaction Against the 'Local'". Reprinted in Axelrod and Deese.

1918 poems
American poems
Poetry by Wallace Stevens